Luigi Ghedina may refer to:

Luigi Ghedina (painter)
Luigi Ghedina (mountain climber)